Mark Pearce (born 19 January 1996) is a British long distance runner. In 2021 he became the British champion in the 3000 metres steeplechase.

Early life
From the age of 11 years-old Pearce attended St Albans School, Hertfordshire.

Career
On 24 September, 2017 Pearce competed at the Berlin Marathon running 2:31.49. On 5 September, 2020 he was runner up in the 3000 metres steeplechase at the British Championships beating his personal best by 10 seconds. The time put him 39th for the year, worldwide. In September 2020 he was added to the University of Birmingham Talent Hub, a scheme designed to help talented athletes with a pathway to become world-class performers. On 26 June, 2021 Pearce went one better than his result in the previous year by winning the 3000 metres steeplechase title at the 2021 British Athletics Championships.

References

1996 births
Living people
British male long-distance runners
British male steeplechase runners
British male marathon runners
British Athletics Championships winners
People educated at St Albans School, Hertfordshire
Alumni of the University of Birmingham